North Lincolnshire, formally known as the Northern Division of Lincolnshire or as Parts of Lindsey, was a county constituency in the Lindsey district of Lincolnshire.  It returned two Members of Parliament (MPs) to the House of Commons of the Parliament of the United Kingdom.

History 

The constituency was created by the Reform Act 1832 for the 1832 general election, and abolished by the Redistribution of Seats Act 1885 for the 1885 general election. It was then split into six new single-seat constituencies: Brigg, Gainsborough, Horncastle, Louth, Sleaford, Spalding and Stamford

Boundaries 
1832–1868: The Parts of Lindsey (see Parts of Lincolnshire).

1868–1885: The Wapentakes, Hundreds, or Sokes of Manley, Yarborough, Bradley Haverstoe, Ludborough, Walshcroft, Aslacoe, Corringham, Louth Eske, and Calceworth, so much as lies within Louth Eske.

Members of Parliament

Election results

Elections in the 1830s

Elections in the 1840s

  
 

Anderson-Pelham succeeded to the peerage, becoming 2nd Earl of Yarborough and causing a by-election.

Elections in the 1850s
Christopher was appointed Chancellor of the Duchy of Lancaster, requiring a by-election.

Elections in the 1860s

Elections in the 1870s

 

Winn was appointed a Lord Commissioner of the Treasury, requiring a by-election.

Elections in the 1880s

 

Laycock's death caused a by-election.

 

Winn was elevated to the peerage, becoming Lord St Oswald, causing a by-election.

Notes

References 

Parliamentary constituencies in Lincolnshire (historic)
Constituencies of the Parliament of the United Kingdom established in 1832
Constituencies of the Parliament of the United Kingdom disestablished in 1885
Parts of Lindsey